PortMidi is a computer library for real time input and output of MIDI data. It is designed to be portable to many different operating systems. PortMidi is part of the PortMusic project.

See also
 PortAudio

External links
portmidi.h – definition of the API and contains the documentation for PortMidi

Audio libraries
Computer libraries